Joseph Schmidt-Görg (born Schmidt 19 March 1897 – 3 April 1981) was a German musicologist, composer and music editor. As a researcher at the University of Bonn and director of the Beethoven Archive, he is regarded as one of the leading Beethoven scholars of his time. He completed the new edition of Beethoven's complete works.

Life 
He achieved the doctorate in 1926 with a dissertation about the masses by Clemens non Papa. He composed masses and other sacred music, including a mass for five-part choir in 1924, a motet, Christus natus est, for eight voices, the same year, and a mass Missa Exultet in 1927.

He officially changed his name in 1930. After his habilitation that year, on Mitteltontemperatur, he lectured at the university, was appointed professor in 1938, and Ordinarius in 1948. He was emerited in 1965.

Schiedermair was a founding member and first director of the Beethoven Archive in Bonn in 1927. He called Schmidt-Görg to be his research assistant. Schmidt-Görg succeeded him as director in 1945 and held the post until 1972. He completed the new edition of Beethoven's complete works, Neue Beethoven-Gesamtausgabe, that Schiedermair had initiated. He edited piano works, in collaboration with his son Hans Schmidt. He also began the publications of the Beethoven House.

Schmidt-Görg died in Bad Neuenahr at the age of 84.

Books 
 Das rheinische Volkslied, Düsseldorf: Schwann, 1934
 Katalog der Handschriften des Beethoven-Hauses und des Beethoven-Archivs Bonn, Bonn 1935
 Nicolas Gombart, Kapellmeister Kaiser Karls V. Leben und Werk, Bonn: Röhrscheid, 1938
 Beethoven. Die Geschichte seiner Familie, Munich: Henle 1964
 Des Bonner Bäckermeisters Gottfried Fischer Aufzeichnungen über Beethovens Jugend, Munich: Henle, 1971
 Beethoven, as editor with Hans Schmidt
 Musik der Gotik, Bonn: Schwippert, 1946

Articles 
 Beethoven und das kurkölnische Geistesleben, in Allgemeine Musikzeitung, Jg. 54 (1927), p. 549f.
 Zur Musikanschauung in den Schriften der hl. Hildegard, in Der Mensch und die Künste. Festschrift für Heinrich Lützeler zum 60. Geburtstag, Düsseldorf 1962, 
 Ein Schiller-Zitat Beethovens in neuer Sicht, in Musik, Edition, Interpretation. Gedenkschrift Günther Henle, Munich 1980,

Further reading 
Thomas Phleps: Ein stiller, verbissener und zäher Kampf um Stetigkeit – Musikwissenschaft in NS-Deutschland und ihre vergangenheitspolitische Bewältigung, in Isolde v. Foerster et al. (ed.),  Musikforschung – Nationalsozialismus – Faschismus, Mainz 2001, .
 Festschrift Joseph Schmidt-Görg zum 60. Geburtstag, edited bu Dagmar Weise, Bonn: Beethoven-Haus, 1957
 Colloquium amicorum. Joseph Schmidt-Görg zum 70. Geburtstag. edited by Siegfried Kross und Hans Schmidt, Bonn: Beethoven-Haus, 1967
 Sieghard Brandenburg, Sammeln und Bewahren – Edieren und Auswerten. Aus der Gründungszeit des Beethoven-Archivs, in Bonner Beethoven-Studien, Vol. 5 (2006),

References

External links 
 
 

20th-century German musicologists
Beethoven scholars
Officers Crosses of the Order of Merit of the Federal Republic of Germany
Academic staff of the University of Bonn
1897 births
1981 deaths
People from Witten